Enmore may refer to:

Places
Enmore, Guyana
Enmore, New South Wales, Australia, a suburb of Sydney
the Enmore Theatre in that suburb
Enmore, Somerset, England

Ships
 Enmore (ship), which arrived in Adelaide from London in January 1846 with George Morphett and James Philcox on board
Enmore (1858), a Bristol built merchant ship